Padise Parish was a rural municipality in Harju County, north-western Estonia. It covered an area of 366.55 km² and had a population of 1,771.

The administrative centre of Padise Parish was Padise village. It is located 47 km south-west from Estonia's capital, Tallinn.

History 
The Padise name is first mentioned in the letter of the Danish king, which in 1283 confirmed the acquisition of the landed property for the future Cistercian Padise Abbey. In 1305 Eric VI of Denmark gave permission to the monks from Dünamünde to build a fortified monastery in Padise, the construction of which began in 1317. In 1343 - at the time of  St. George's Night Uprising - the first floor and part of the main floor walls were finished. The monastery was burnt down and 28 monks, lay brothers and German vassals were killed. The rebuilding of the monastery began only after 1370 and the consecration of the main building took place as late as 1448. The monastery ceased to exist in 1559 during the Livonian War.

Local government 
The mayor was Leemet Vaikmaa.

Geography

Populated places 
There were 24 villages (est: külad, sg. küla) in Padise Parish: Alliklepa, Altküla, Änglema, Audevälja, Harju-Risti, Hatu, Karilepa, Kasepere, Keibu, Kobru, Kõmmaste, Kurkse, Laane, Langa, Määra, Madise, Metslõugu, Padise, Pae, Pedase, Suurküla, Vihterpalu, Vilivalla, Vintse.

References

External links 
  
Padise Map

Former municipalities of Estonia